John Lovel may refer to:
 John Lovel, 1st Baron Lovel, English noble
 John Lovel, 2nd Baron Lovel, English noble